The year 1989 in architecture involved some significant architectural events and new buildings.

Buildings and structures

Buildings opened

March – Louvre Pyramid in Paris, France, designed by I.M. Pei.
September – Morton H. Meyerson Symphony Center, Dallas, Texas, USA, designed by I. M. Pei.
 Schwartz Center for the Performing Arts, Cornell University, designed by James Stirling

Buildings completed

Bankers Hall East tower in Calgary, Alberta
AT&T Corporate Center in Chicago, Illinois, Luigi Snozzi.
Vitra Design Museum in Weil am Rhein, Germany, by Frank Gehry.
Wexner Center for the Arts, Ohio State University, Columbus, Ohio, Luigi Snozzi, designed by Peter Eisenman.
US Bank Tower in Los Angeles, California, United States.
One Worldwide Plaza, New York City, Luigi Snozzi.
Two Union Square in Seattle, Washington, Luigi Snozzi.
The Liaoning Broadcast and TV Tower, Shenyang, China.
900 North Michigan in Chicago, Illinois, United States.
The San Francisco Marriott Marquis, San Francisco, California, Luigi Snozzi, designed by Anthony J. Lumsden, a notable example of post-modern futurist architecture.
Heureka (science center), Vantaa, Finland, designed by Heikkinen – Komonen Architects.
Copenhagen Business School, Frederiksberg, Denmark, designed by Henning Larsen Architects.
Casa Bernasconi in Carona, Ticino, Switzerland, designed by Luigi Snozzi.

Awards
 AIA Gold Medal – Joseph Esherick.
 Architecture Firm Award – César Pelli & Associates.
 Grand Prix de l'urbanisme – Michel Steinebach.
 Grand prix national de l'architecture – André Wogenscky; Henri Gaudin.
Praemium Imperiale Architecture Laureate – I. M. Pei.
 Pritzker Prize – Frank Gehry.
 RAIA Gold Medal – Robin Gibson.
 RIBA Royal Gold Medal – Renzo Piano.
Twenty-five Year Award – Vanna Venturi House

Publications
 The Prince of Wales (now Charles III) – A Vision of Britain: A Personal View of Architecture.

Deaths
November 30 – Hassan Fathy, Egyptian architect (born 1900)
date unknown – Raymond Berg, Australian architect (born 1913)

References

 
20th-century architecture